Javier "Javi" Duarte Egea (born 22 December 1997) is a Spanish professional footballer who plays as a central midfielder for Algeciras C.F.

Club career
Born in Málaga, Andalusia, Duarte joined Cádiz CF's youth setup in 2015, after representing CD 26 de Febrero and Málaga CF. Promoted to the reserves ahead of the 2016–17 campaign, he made his senior debut on 4 September 2016 by starting in a 2–0 División de Honor home win against Xerez CD.

Duarte was a regular starter for the B's as the side achieved promotion to the Tercera División, and scored his first goal on 1 November 2017, in a 3–1 home defeat of CD Ciudad de Lucena. On 7 August 2019, after helping the B-team achieve another promotion, he renewed his contract with the club until 2022.

Duarte made his first team debut on 17 December 2019, playing the full 90 minutes in a 1–0 win at CD Lealtad, in the season's Copa del Rey. He made his professional debut the following 17 July, coming on as a second-half substitute for Augusto Fernández in a 0–1 loss at Girona FC in the Segunda División.

References

External links
 
 
 

1997 births
Living people
Footballers from Málaga
Spanish footballers
Association football midfielders
Segunda División players
Segunda División B players
Tercera División players
Divisiones Regionales de Fútbol players
Cádiz CF B players
Cádiz CF players